Massey is a surname, and may refer to:

Academia, research and science
 Doreen Massey (geographer) (1944–2016), British social scientist and geographer
 Harrie Massey, Australian mathematical physicist
 James Massey, American information theorist and cryptographer
 Kenneth Massey, American mathematician and sports statistician
 Mary Massey (1915 – 1974), American historian of the American Civil War
 Walter E. Massey, American university president
 William A. Massey (mathematician), American mathematician
 William S. Massey (1920–2017), American mathematician

Arts and entertainment

Actors
 Anna Massey, British actress, daughter of Raymond Massey
 Brandi Chavonne Massey, American stage actress and singer
 Christopher Massey, American actor
 Daniel Massey (actor) (1933–1998), British-Canadian actor, son of Raymond Massey
 Edith Massey, American actress
 Ilona Massey, Hungarian-born American actress
 Kyle Massey, American actor, brother of Christopher Massey
 Petra Massey, British actress 
 Raymond Massey, Canadian actor, brother of Vincent Massey
 Vikrant Massey, Indian actor

Others in arts and entertainment
 Alana Massey, American author
 Arthur Massey (composer), Australian organist
 Brandon Massey, American horror writer
 Devon Massey, comics artist
 Drew Massey, puppeteer
 Gerald Massey, English poet
 Graham Massey, British musician
 John Massey (artist) (born 1950), Canadian artist
 John Massey (poet), a conjectured author of Sir Gawain and the Green Knight
 Joseph Massey sen. (1826–1900), Australian musician with a family of organists 
 Sujata Massey, mystery writer

Business
 Daniel Massey (manufacturer) (1798–1856), farm implement manufacturer
 Hart Massey, Canadian businessman
 Jack C. Massey (1904–1990), American venture capitalist and entrepreneur

Crime
 Jason Massey, American convicted double murderer
 John Massey (prisoner), one-time longest serving prisoner in the United Kingdom
 Paul Massey, English organised crime figure from Salford

Military
 Alan Massey, Vice Admiral in the British Royal Navy
 Edward Massey, British soldier

Politics
 Denton Massey, Canadian politician
 Doreen Massey, Baroness Massey of Darwen (born 1938), Labour member of the House of Lords
 Jack Massey (politician) (1885–1964), New Zealand politician of the Reform Party and then the National Party
 John E. Massey (1819–1901), Lieutenant Governor of Virginia
 John Massey (MP) (fl. 1414), English Member of Parliament
 Nehemiah George Massey, Canadian politician, namesake of the George Massey Tunnel
 Nellah Massey, (1893–1956), maiden name of Nellah Massey Bailey, American politician and librarian
 William Massey (1856–1925), Prime Minister of New Zealand
 William A. Massey, U.S. Senator
 William Nathaniel Massey (1809–1881), British author and politician
 Vincent Massey, Canadian politician, brother of Raymond Massey

Sport

Baseball
 Bill Massey (baseball) (1871–1940), baseball player in 1894
 Michael Massey (born 1998), American baseball player
 Mike Massey (baseball), American baseball player

Cricket
 Bruce Massey (1906–1994), New Zealand cricketer
 Eileen Massey (1935-2019), Australian cricketer
 John Massey (cricketer) (1899–1963), English cricketer
 William Massey (cricketer) (1846–1899), played cricket for Somerset and Lancashire
 William Massey (rower) (1817–1898), rowed and played cricket for Cambridge University

Other sports
 Chris Massey, American football player
 Bill Massey (softball) (1936–2020), New Zealand softball player
 Debbie Massey, American golfer
 Jack Massey (footballer) (died 1981), Australian rules footballer
 John Massey (rugby league), rugby league footballer who played in the 1950s
 Matthew and Nicholas Massey, American professional wrestlers collectively known as The Young Bucks
 Mike Massey, American professional pocket-billiards player

Other
 Geoffrey Massey (1924–2020), Canadian architect and urban planner
 Morris Massey, producer of training videos

See also
 Massey family
 Masih (surname)
 Massie (surname)
 Massey (disambiguation)

English-language surnames
Surnames of Norman origin